The Griswolds' Broadway Vacation is a musical with a book, music, and lyrics by David Rossmer and Steve Rosen. It is based on the characters from the National Lampoon's Vacation film series.

Productions 
Originally titled Broadway Vacation, the musical had an industry reading in November 2019, starring Kerry Butler and Will Swenson.

The musical's world premiere was planned for fall 2020 at the 5th Avenue Theatre in Seattle, but the production was delayed due to the COVID-19 pandemic and rescheduled for fall 2022. It opened on September 22, 2022, after beginning previews on September 13, and closed on October 2. Directed and choreographed by Donna Feore, the premiere production starred Megan Reinking as Ellen and Hunter Foster as Clark. Kate Rockwell was originally slated to play Ellen, but she left the production because of her pregnancy.

The production was expected to move to Houston for a brief engagement at Theatre Under The Stars after its premiere in Seattle, but the production company's creative director announced the cancellation of the Houston run in July 2022.

References

External links 
 

2022 musicals
American musicals
Musicals based on films